Washington Square News (WSN) is the weekly student newspaper of New York University (NYU). It has a circulation of 10,000 and an estimated 55,000 online readers. It is published in print on Monday, in addition to online publication Tuesday through Friday during the fall and spring semesters, with additional issues published in the summer. It serves the NYU, Greenwich Village, and East Village communities in Manhattan, New York City.

History 
The newspaper was born in 1973 as the result of NYU's merging of their two campus weeklies: the University Heights campus in the Bronx had published The Heights Daily News, while the Washington Square campus in Lower Manhattan originally published The Washington Square Journal.

Between 2003 and 2004, WSN debuted the "Bobst Boy" story, which went on to become an overnight national sensation.

In 2000, WSN launched its website nyunews.com. In 2017, WSN launched its podcast, "Newsflash", and then rebranded the following year as "Washington Square Noise". In 2018, WSN launched its digital weekly magazine, Under the Arch.

In late September 2020, the entire staff of WSN resigned after disagreements with the university over their faculty advisor. The resignation lasted until the mid March, 2021, when the staff returned after the hiring of a new editor.

Staff 
WSN is run solely by NYU students, with the paper's senior staff mostly composed of undergraduates. Its offices are located at 75 Third Avenue. It serves the student population by helping with opportunities for reporting, writing, editing, coding, photography, video production, design, illustration and business.

The paper is editorially and financially independent from the university and is solely responsible in selling advertisements to fund its production, with an average cost of US$350,000 annually.

The term for the positions of editor-in-chief is one academic year, beginning in the summer semester and ending after the spring semester.

Awards 

In 2009, reporters Marc Beja and Adam Playford (Editor-in-Chief, 2008) won first place in the category of "Best News Story" from the New York State Press Association and National Winner in the category of "In-depth reporting" from the Society of Professional Journalists. At the same time Alvin Chang (Editor-in-Chief, 2007) won best columnist.

Washington Square News won an Associated Collegiate Press Pacemaker award in 2004, that same year it was awarded the title of Overall Best Newspaper. It won the Pacemaker Award again in 2019.

In 2003, the paper won seven first-place awards in the Division 1 "Better College Newspaper Contest" of the New York State Press Association.

Notable former staff 

Shaun Assael, author, staff writer at ESPN The Magazine
Bill Bastone, editor, The Smoking Gun
Cindy Behrman, advertising editor, Suddler & Hennesey; writer, Village Voice and New York Press (deceased July 22, 2008)
Marc H. Bell, CEO of Penthouse Media Group; board of trustees, New York University
Russell Berman, reporter, The Hill
Matt Buchanan, executive editor, Eater
Alvin Chang, head of visuals and data, Guardian US
Fred Clarke, Democratic Party communications strategist; IBM communications manager
Katherine Creag, television reporter, Good Day New York
Charles Dharapak, photojournalist
 Jill Filipovic, author and writer at Feministe
Bradley Hope, reporter, The Wall Street Journal
Eileen "E.P." Gunn, 'Eco-Nomics' columnist, TheStreet.com, freelance writer/editor/lecturer
Gary He, freelance photojournalist
Annette Heist, senior producer, Gimlet Media
Tim Herrera, founding editor, The New York Times Smarter Living
Eric Kohn, senior editor and chief film critic, Indiewire
Jessica Letkemann, former editor, billboard.com
Mark Mueller, former staff writer, Newark Star-Ledger (shares 2005 Pulitzer Prize)
Jon Mummolo, Princeton University politics professor
Lindsay Noonan, Writer/Producer at CNN
Andrew Nusca, executive editor, Morning Brew
Amy Odell, author and former editor, Cosmopolitan
Brian O'Keefe, deputy editor, Fortune Magazine
Kira Peikoff, author, The Unholy Grail
Adam Playford, editor, The New York Times
David E. Rovella, managing editor at Bloomberg News, Attorney
Joel Sherman, sportswriter/columnist, New York Post
Rachel Holliday Smith, reporter, The City
Gene Weingarten, Washington Post columnist; 2008, 2010 Pulitzer Prize winner
Scott Wenger, former managing editor/money & business, New York Daily News, and former editorial director, Barron's

See also 

List of New York City newspapers and magazines

References

External links 
Washington Square News
Washington Square News at New York University Archives at New York University Special Collections

Daily newspapers published in New York City
Student newspapers published in New York (state)
New York University
1973 establishments in New York City
Publications established in 1973